The Future Retro 777 is a monophonic analog synthesizer with a digital sequencer and is out of production.

External links 
 Official product page

References 

Analog synthesizers
Monophonic synthesizers